The Red Volta or Nazinon is a waterway flowing located in West Africa. It emerges near Ouagadougou in Burkina Faso and has a length of about 320 km which it joins the White Volta in Ghana.

The river is primarily located in Burkina Faso and crosses a segment of the international border between Burkina Faso and Ghana. It flows into Ghana's Upper East region and empties into the White Volta.

References

Volta River
Rivers of Burkina Faso
Rivers of Ghana
Burkina Faso–Ghana border
International rivers of Africa
Border rivers